Baldon Row is a hamlet in Toot Baldon civil parish, about  southeast of Oxford in Oxfordshire.

External links

Hamlets in Oxfordshire
South Oxfordshire District